Joe Campbell (November 4, 1936 - October 2, 2005) was an American actor who appeared in the 1965 film My Hustler. In the film Campbell's role was called "Sugar Plum Fairy". Campbell was mentioned as "the Sugar Plum Fairy" in the 1972 Lou Reed song "Walk on the Wild Side". Campbell was given that nickname by Dorothy Dean. Campbell was in a relationship with Harvey Milk  from 1955 to 1962. He died on October 2, 2005. He was 68 years old.

References

1936 births
2005 deaths
American gay actors
20th-century American LGBT people